Alfred Iosifovich Kuchevsky (17 May 1931 – 15 May 2000) was a Soviet professional ice hockey defenceman. He played for the HC Krylya Sovetov Moscow of the Soviet Championship League and represented the Soviet Union national ice hockey team in international competitions. He was Olympic champion in 1956, won an Olympic bronze medal in 1960, was world champion in 1954, and won silver medals at the world championships in 1955 and 1958.

Biography
Kuchevsky was born on 17 May 1931 in Moscow, Soviet Union. His father worked as Director of the Krylya Sovetov Stadium near the metro station Semyonovskaya.

He attended Moscow School No. 429.

While playing for the Krylya Sovetov Moscow in 1949–61, he won the USSR Cup in 1951, was a runner-up twice (1952, 1954), and became the national ice hockey champion in 1957, earning silver three times (1955, 1956, 1958), and bronze five times (1950, 1951, 1954, 1959, 1960). He played 240 matches at the USSR championships, scored 37 goals.

After finishing his career as player, he worked at the Krylya Sovetov Moscow until 1972, starting as an assistant coach at his hockey club for four seasons, then managing a sports school. At one time, he served as a hockey referee and sports journalist. Following his complete retirement from hockey, he was responsible for organizing the first sports lotteries in the Soviet Union.

In 1954, he was awarded the title Honoured Master of Sports of the USSR in ice hockey, which holders are unofficially known as inductees of the Russian and Soviet Hockey Hall of Fame.

He was awarded the Medal "For Labour Valour" in 1957, and the Order of Friendship in 1996.

On 15 May 2000, he died in Moscow and later was buried at the Troyekurovskoye Cemetery.

In 2011, Alfred Kuchevsky was posthumously inducted into the International Jewish Sports Hall of Fame.

See also
 List of select Jewish ice hockey players

References

External links
 
 
 Alfred Kuchevsky at Hockey CCCP International

1931 births
2000 deaths
Burials in Troyekurovskoye Cemetery
Honoured Masters of Sport of the USSR
Ice hockey players at the 1956 Winter Olympics
Ice hockey players at the 1960 Winter Olympics
International Jewish Sports Hall of Fame inductees
Krylya Sovetov Moscow players
Medalists at the 1956 Winter Olympics
Medalists at the 1960 Winter Olympics
Olympic bronze medalists for the Soviet Union
Olympic gold medalists for the Soviet Union
Olympic ice hockey players of the Soviet Union
Olympic medalists in ice hockey
Soviet ice hockey defencemen
Ice hockey people from Moscow